Parazodarion is a genus of spiders in the family Zodariidae. It was first described in 2009 by Ovtchinnikov, Ahmad & Gurko. , it contains only one species, Parazodarion raddei, found in central Asia.

References

Zodariidae
Monotypic Araneomorphae genera
Spiders of Asia